Siddiq Mohammed Manzul (1932 – 11 April 2003) was a Sudanese footballer who played with Al-Hilal Club. He participated in the first Africa Cup of Nations in 1957 and again in 1959.

Honours

Club
Al-Hilal Club
Khartoum League: 1953, 1955, 1958, 1959, 1960, 1961, 1963

International goals

References

1932 births
2003 deaths
Sudanese footballers
Sudan international footballers
1957 African Cup of Nations players
1959 African Cup of Nations players
Association football forwards
Al-Hilal Club (Omdurman) players
People from Omdurman